May Craig (1889 - 1972) was an Irish actress. She was born in Dublin.

Career 
She was first listed as May Craig in 1907 in the world premiere of The Playboy of the Western World. She became an actress with the Abbey Theatre from 1916 to 1968. During her professional life with the Abbey Theatre she appeared in many productions which can be seen in the Abbey Theatre archives. May Craig performed on six tours of North America with the Abbey Theatre and has been described as one of Ireland's senior character actresses. She made her American debut in 1932, at the Ambassador Theater, New York. While in New York during 1932-33 she appeared in Autumn Fire, The Big House, King Oedipus, The Well of the Saints and Church Street.

In 1931 she appeared in a play by Irish playwright Teresa Deevy called A Disciple and in 1947 she appeared in In Search of Valour where she played the part of Mrs. Maher.
As an actress, May Craig has been seen in movies such as The Rising of the Moon (1957), The Quiet Man (1952), Girl with Green Eyes (1964), Johnny Nobody (1961) and Saintly Sinners (1962).

She died on 8 February 1972 in Dublin, Ireland. She is buried at Glasnevin Cemetery.

Selected filmography

 The Quiet Man 1952
 The Rising of the Moon 1957
 Johnny Nobody 1961
 Saintly Sinners 1962
 Girl with Green Eyes 1964

Playography 

 The Playboy of the Western World 1907
 A Disciple 1931
 In Search of Valour 1947

References

External links 
May Craig at the Teresa Deevy Archive
May Craig at the Abbey Theatre Archive
May Craig at the Internet movie database

1889 births
1972 deaths
Irish film actresses
Irish stage actresses
20th-century Irish actresses
Actresses from Dublin (city)